State Road 575 (NM 575) is a  state highway in the US state of New Mexico. NM 575's southern terminus is at U.S. Route 64 (US 64) in Blanco, and the northern terminus is at NM 173 east of Aztec.

Major intersections

See also

References

575
Transportation in San Juan County, New Mexico